KWMG may refer to:

 KWMG-LP, a low-power radio station (99.9 FM) licensed to serve White City, Oregon, United States
 KOSY-FM, a radio station (95.7 FM) licensed to serve Anamosa, Iowa, United States, which held the call sign KWMG from 2012 to 2013